The Adventures of Bill and Bob is a 1920 American silent action film directed by Robert N. Bradbury and starring Bob Steele (his son). It was the first film Steele (Bob Bradbury, Jr) starred in. His twin brother Bill Bradbury also starred in it. The series was produced by Cyrus J. Williams. It consisted of 15 two-reel episodes.

The film is about twin boys in the mountains and their animal hunting and trapping efforts.

Cast
Bob Steele as Bob (credited as Bob Bradbury Jr.)
Bill Bradbury as Bill
Jeanne Carpenter

References

External links
 

1920 films
1920s action films
American silent serial films
American black-and-white films
American action films
Silent action films
1920s American films